Cambarus dubius, the Upland burrowing crayfish, is a species of burrowing crayfish native to Kentucky, Tennessee, Virginia and North Carolina in the United States.

It is believed to form a species complex.

References

Cambaridae
Freshwater crustaceans of North America
Crustaceans described in 1884
Taxa named by Walter Faxon